Archie Bell & the Drells was an American R&B vocal group from Houston, Texas, and one of the main acts on Kenneth Gamble and Leon Huff's Philadelphia International Records. The band's hits include "Tighten Up", "I Can't Stop Dancing" (both 1968), "There's Gonna Be a Showdown", "Girl You're Too Young" (1969), "Here I Go Again" (also a UK hit in 1972), "Soul City Walk" (1975), "Let's Groove", "Everybody Have a Good Time" (1977), and "Don't Let Love Get You Down" (1976).

History

Early days
Archie Bell (born September 1, 1944), who founded the group, was born in Henderson, Texas, his family moving to Houston before he was a year old. He is the second oldest of seven brothers. His brother Ricky Bell (d. 1984) was an NFL player. Eugene Bell was the final brother. Archie formed the group in 1966 with his friends James Wise, Willie Parnell and Billy Butler. They signed with the Houston-based record label Ovide in 1967 and recorded a number of songs including "She's My Woman" and "Tighten Up", which was recorded in October 1967 at the first of several sessions in which the Drells were backed by the instrumental group the T.S.U. Toronadoes.

The origins of "Tighten Up" came from a conversation Bell had with Butler. Bell was despondent after receiving his draft notice, and Butler, in an attempt to cheer him up, demonstrated the "Tighten Up" dance to Bell.

Bell's promoter, Skipper Lee Frazier, unsuccessfully began pushing the flip side of "Tighten Up", a song called "Dog Eat Dog". But at the recommendation of a friend, he gave the other side a try. "Tighten Up", written by Archie Bell and Billy Butler, contained Archie Bell prodding listeners to dance to the funky musical jam developed by the T.S.U. Toronadoes, and it became a hit in Houston before it was picked up by Atlantic Records for distribution in April 1968. By the summer it topped both the Billboard R&B and pop charts. It also received a R.I.A.A. gold disc by selling 1 million copies. According to the Billboard Book of Number One Hits by Fred Bronson, Bell heard a comment after the Kennedy assassination in Dallas that "nothing good ever came out of Texas." Bell wanted his listeners to know "we were from Texas and we were good."

Many believe Bell was wounded in action in Vietnam while the band was still at the height of its fame, but he actually injured his leg in a truck accident while stationed in Germany. The success of the single prompted the band to rush out an album, despite their incapacitated leader.  In 1969 the group recorded their first full album with Gamble and Huff, I Can't Stop Dancing, which reached number 28 on the R&B album chart. By this time another of Archie's brothers, Lee Bell (born January 14, 1946, Houston), had replaced Butler, and became the band's choreographer.

Reid Farrell, who was from Houston, was the guitarist who traveled and played with the group.

Later career
The band backing Archie Bell & the Drells from 1975 to 1979 was called "The Melting Pot Band", which featured musicians from several states. McNasty McKnight was the band leader playing trombone. Graduates of the High School for the Performing and Visual Arts (HSPVA) in Houston traveled with the group, including Don Pope and Tony Salvaggio on saxophone. Other musicians included Lonnie LaLanne and Calvin Owens (trumpet), Abel Salazar (keyboards), and Mike Hughes (drums). LaLanne and Owens were alumni of B.B. King's band.

In 1975, the band released their "total-disco comeback album," Dance Your Troubles Away. The single "Soul City Walk" made number 13 in the UK Singles Chart, but reached only number 42 on the US R&B chart. After moderate chart showings in the late 1970s, the group split in 1980. Archie Bell later released one solo album titled I Never Had It So Good in 1981 on Becket Records, and continued to perform with the Drells for the next twenty years. During the 1990s the lineup also included Steve "Stevie G." Guettler (guitar, vocals), Jeff "JT" Strickler (bass guitar, vocals), Steve Farrell (guitar, vocals), Mike Wilson (keyboards, vocals) and Wes Armstrong (drums, vocals) of the Atlanta-based group The Rockerz.

On April 16, 2013, the Mayor of Houston Annise Parker honored Archie Bell, Lucious Larkins, and James Wise with a proclamation of Archie Bell and the Drells Day.

Discography

Albums

Singles

See also

List of soul musicians
List of disco artists (A-E)
List of artists who reached number one on the Hot 100 (U.S.)
List of artists who reached number one on the Billboard R&B chart
List of Soul Train episodes
List of performers on Top of the Pops

Notes

References

Other sources
Whitburn, Joel (2011). Record Research Online Database. "Archie Bell" Billboard Chart Discography. Retrieved March 25, 2011.

External links
Archie Bell article on The Standard Report website
Archie Bell; My Space
Music Legends Part 2: Archie Bell & The Drells
Archie Bell & the Drells at PhillySoulClassics.com
 
 

Musical groups from Philadelphia
Philadelphia International Records artists
American soul musical groups
Musical groups established in 1966
Musical groups disestablished in 1980
Atlantic Records artists
Chess Records artists
Musical groups from Houston
Northern soul musicians
1966 establishments in Texas